Stadionul Delta is a multi-use stadium in Tulcea, Romania. It is currently used mostly for football matches and is the home ground of Delta Dobrogea Tulcea. The stadium holds 6,600 people.

External links
Stadionul Delta at soccerway.com

Football venues in Romania
Tulcea
Buildings and structures in Tulcea County